Events during the year 2023 in Bhutan.

Incumbents

Events

Scheduled 

 20 March – 2023 SAFF U-17 Women's Championship

References 

2023 in Asia
Bhutan
2020s in Bhutan
Years of the 21st century in Bhutan